An updated Numbering Plan for Niue took effect from 1 May 2018. The Country Code for Niue is +683, and the International Call Prefix is 00.

Allocations

See also 
 Communications in Niue

References

Niue
Communications in Niue
Niue-related lists